The GS Caltex Cup (Korean: GS칼텍스배) is a Go competition.

Outline
The GS Caltex Cup replaced the LG Refined Oil Cup. It is organized by the Maeil Business Newspaper, Maeil Broadcasting Network (MBN), and Korea Baduk Association, and sponsored by GS Caltex. It currently has the biggest prize in South Korea. As of 2021, the winner receives 70 million won in prize money, and the runner-up receives 30 million won. The final is a best-of-5. Komi is 6.5 points and the time limit is 10 minutes main time with 3 x 40s byoyomi.

Past winners and runners-up

References

External links
 Sensei's Library
 Go to Everyone!
 Korea Baduk Association (in Korean)

Go competitions in South Korea
GS Group